This is a list of Czech Football League managers. It includes every manager currently managing a club in the Czech First League and Czech 2. Liga, in order of the date of their appointment. The Czech First League and Czech 2. Liga are the only two fully professional football leagues in the Czech Republic, and consist of 32 clubs in total, 16 from each league.

Some managers listed have had more than one spell in charge at their current club, however their time as manager is counted only from the date of their last appointment. Only two managers have spent more than three years at their current job.

Managers

References 

Czech Football League